György Györiványi Ráth (born 6 May 1961) is a Hungarian opera and symphonic music conductor.

Biography
As music director of the Hungarian State Opera, he created the first 3D performance of an opera in the world: Béla Bartok's Bluebird's castle and managed the Opera House over the most sold-out years of the past 15 years.

He was the 10th chairman-conductor of the Budapest Philharmonic Orchestra when he conducted the first time after the composer Mahler his Symphonic poem in two parts, thought lost for a long time. He himself reconstructed the work from the existing manuscripts, for which work he was granted the Doctor Liberalium Artium title from the University of Pécs.

His professional work has been closely connected to the re-discovery of Ernő Dohnányi’s orchestral works, and he conducted Franz Schmidt's Symphony 4 the first time in Budapest, 75 years after its premiere in Vienna.

He is a regular guest conductor in Teatro Colón in Buenos Aires, the Hamburg Staatsoper, the Lyric Theater in Chicago, the Teatro la Fenice in Venice, Teatro Regio di Torino the opera houses in Rome and Nice, and of symphonic orchestras like the Seville Royal Philharmonics, the Symphonic Orchestra of the Italian Radio, the Seoul Philharmonics and the Zagrab Philharmonics. He worked in most countries of the world with artists like Marcello Alvarez, Renato Bruson, José Cura, Daniela Dessì, Norma Fantini, Ferruccio Furlanetto, Maria Guleghina, Sumi Jo, Zoltán Zoltán, Gidon Kremer, Éva Marton, Viktoria Mullova, Leo Nucci, Uto Ughi, Giacomo Prestia, Samuel Ramey, Vadim Repin, Sylvia Sass and Grigorij Sokolov.

György G. Ráth regularly teaches young musicians. He wrote a book on conducting, including his personal experience and things he had learned during his own studies from his Hungarian teachers, László Somogyi and Ervin Lukács, as well as from Franco Ferrara in Italy, Leonard Bernstein and Seiji Ozawa in the United States, Kurt Masur in Germany and Karl Österreicher in Austria.

György G. Ráth started his career in 1986 by winning the Toscanini competition in Parma.

Articles and reviews 
 Nice City Life: concert for the 70th anniversary of Nice Philharmonic Orchestra
 Riviera Buzz: concert for the 70th anniversary of Nice Philharmonic Orchestra
 France 3 about the First Edition of Opéra de Nice Conducting Competition
 György G. Ráth on Opera Magazine
 Performarts: review of Don Giovanni 28 January 2019
 Royal Monaco: György G. Ráth nouveau directeur musical de l'Opéra de Nice
 www.presseagence.fr: György G. Ráth, nouveau Directeur musical de l’Orchestre Philharmonique de Nice
 Il Corriere Musicale (in Italian) review of the CD "In-canto" with music by the composer Silvia Colasanti
 Il Corriere Musicale (in Italian) review of the concert with [https://www.haydn.it/ Orchestra Haydn] with the pianist Peter Lang
 Reviews and quotes on the personal website of the conductor

Activity as conductor/music director 

 Orchestra Giovanile Italiana 1990, 1992, 1993, 1995
 Budapest Philharmonic Orchestra 2011-2014
 http://www.opera-nice.org since 2017

Discography 

- Kamilló Lendvay: Five Concertos; Budapest Symphony Orchestra, Hamar Zsolt, Hungarian State Chamber Choir, Hungaroton 
- Béla Bartók: Divertimento - Weiner: Divertimento No. 1 - Kreisler: Altwiener Tanzweisen, Magyar Virtuózok Kamarazenekar, Szenthelyi Miklós 
- Carlo Colombara - The Art of the Bass; Orchestra della Svizzera Italiana/György G. Ráth; NAXOS
- Ernst von Dohnányi, Piano concertos; Budapest Symphony Orchestra Orchestra, László Baranyai Piano; Hungaroton 
- complete discography on the personal website of the conductor

Notes

External links 

 Personal website: https://www.rath.info.hu
 Website of Opéra de Nice
 Facebook

Hungarian conductors (music)
Male conductors (music)
1961 births
Living people
20th-century conductors (music)
20th-century Hungarian musicians
21st-century conductors (music)
21st-century Hungarian musicians
Musicians from Budapest
20th-century Hungarian male musicians
21st-century Hungarian male musicians